Perrineville is an unincorporated community located within Millstone Township in Monmouth County, New Jersey, United States. The area is served as United States Postal Service ZIP code 08535.

As of the 2000 United States Census, the population for ZIP Code Tabulation Area 08535 was 2,073.

A lake in the center of the community, Perrineville Lake, is a preserved area maintained by the Monmouth County Park System.

Perrineville is home to the Perrineville Jewish Center, a synagogue established in 1910 in the center of the community. More than 130 families attend prayer services regularly, led by Rabbi Sheldon Schevelowitz.

References

Millstone Township, New Jersey
Unincorporated communities in Monmouth County, New Jersey
Unincorporated communities in New Jersey